Kings XI Punjab (KXIP) is a franchise cricket team based in Mohali, Punjab in India, and is one of the teams participating in the Indian Premier League (IPL). KXIP was founded in 2008. The franchise is owned by actress Preity Zinta, Ness Wadia of Bombay Dyeing, Karan Paul of the Apeejay Surendera Group and Mohit Burman of Dabur. The group paid  million to acquire the franchise. It is owned by a consortium, along with the Rajasthan Royals. Along with the Rajasthan Royals, KXIP's franchise agreement was terminated by the Board of Control for Cricket in India (BCCI) in October 2010, because the teams had been signed by people who were not members of the consortium which owned the team. A petition of arbitration (appeal) was filed to the Bombay High Court in November 2010, challenging the decision, which was accepted a month later.

KXIP played their first Twenty20 match in 2008 during the first season of the IPL, where they reached the semi-final. They lost the 2008 semi-final to Chennai Super Kings on 31 May 2008, after playing fourteen matches in the league, winning ten matches and losing four. With ten international cricketers in 2009, they finished fifth in the second season of the IPL, winning and losing seven matches. KXIP finished in eighth place in the third IPL season, losing eleven of their fourteen matches. KXIP improved in the fourth season of the IPL, finishing in fifth place with seven losses and victories. In the IPL's fifth season in 2012, the team played sixteen matches, winning eight and losing nine to finish in sixth position. In the 2013 season, they won eight matches out of sixteen, and lost the other eight. In the 2014 season, they won 11 of 14 matches. In the 2015 season, KXIP won three of fourteen matches and finished in last position. In the IPL's ninth season, KXIP won four of fourteen matches and finished in last position. In the 2017 season, KXIP won seven of fourteen matches to finish in fifth position.

Shaun Marsh is KXIP's leading run scorer, with 2,477 runs. He, along with Mahela Jayawardene, Adam Gilchrist, Hashim Amla, David Miller, Virender Sehwag, Wriddhiman Saha, Paul Valthaty, Mayank Agarwal, KL Rahul and Chris Gayle has scored a century for the team. Miller's batting average of 43.72 is the highest in the team. Piyush Chawla has played 87 matches, the most by any KXIP player. Saha has effected the most stumpings in the team.

The first list includes all players who have played in at least one match for KXIP and is initially listed alphabetically by their last name. The second list comprises all those players who have captained the team in at least one match, arranged in the order of the first match as captain. Many players have also represented other teams of the IPL, but only the records of their games for KXIP are given.

Key

Players

Captains

See also

List of Indian Premier League centuries
List of Indian Premier League records and statistics

Notes

Footnotes

References

External links
Official website of Kings XI Punjab

Kings XI Punjab
Punjab Kings cricketers
Cricketers